Chalappurathu Raveendranatha Menon (1950 – 24 November 2007), popularly known as Ravi Menon was a veteran Indian film actor who worked in Malayalam cinema. He was born in Sreekrishnapuram, Palakkad in 1950. He completed diploma from the Film and Television Institute of India in Pune and made his debut in Malayalam movie,  Nirmalyam. Ravi Menon also got the state government special jury award for his role in 'Nirmalayam'. His first movie was Mani Kaul's Duvidha for which he was nominated for the national best actor award . His notable movies includes Shalini Ente Koottukari, Shyama, Kilukkam, Minnaram''. He acted in more than 50 Malayalam movies.

He hailed from Karimpuzha in Palakkad district. He died in Perinthalmanna, Kerala on 24 November 2007. He was 57. He was suffering from cancer for long time in his last days. He was a bachelor.

Filmography

 2006 - Pathaka As Kelappan Nair
 2004 - Ee Snehatheerathu
 2004 - Parinamam
 2003 - Shingari Bolona As Bank Manager Stephen
 2002 - Swapna Halliyil Orunaal
 2002 - Onnaman
 2001 - Vezhambal
 2000 - Varnakkazchchakal
 1999 - Crime File As Priest
 1998 - Magician Mahendralal from Delhi As Vareed
 1995 - Maanthrikam As Priest
 1995 - Oru Abhibashakante Case Diary
 1994 - Minnaram As Priest
 1994 - Parinayam As Krishnan
 1991 - Raid
 1991 - Bhoomika
 1990 - Indrajalam
 1990 - Sthreekku Vendi Sthree
 1989 - Antharjanam As Priest
 1989 - Aval Oru Sindhu
 1988 - Bheekaran
 1988 - Agnichirakulla Thumbi
 1987 - Swargam
 1987 - Cheppu
 1987 - Narathan Keralathil
 1986 - Thalavattom
 1986 - Swamy Sreenarayana Guru
 1985 - Chorakku Chora (1985) As Paulose
 1984 - Oru Kochu Swapnam
 1984 - Nishedi As Ravi
 1984 - Swantham Sarika As Raveendran Nair
 1984 - Krishna Guruvayoorappa As Srikrishnan
 1983 - Nizhal Moodiya Nirangal
 1983 - Varanmaare Aavashyamundu
 1983 - Ahankaram
 1983 - Swapname Ninakku Nandi As Mammukka/Appu
 1983 - Sandhya Vandanam As Mammathu
 1983 - Ashtapadi
 1982 - Komaram
 1982 - Sahyante Makan
 1982 - Kanmanikkorumma (Ushnabhoomi)
 1981 - Orikkal Koodi
 1981 - Greeshmam
 1981 - Arathi
 1981 - Sambhavam
 1981 - Pinneyum Pookkunna Kaadu
 1981 - Vida Parayum Munpe
 1980 - Karimpana
 1980 - Raagam Thaanam Pallavi As Venu
 1980 - Shalini Ente Koottukari
 1980 - Soorya Daaham
 1979 - Thenthulli
 1979 - Ente Neelakasham
 1979 - Raathrikal Ninakku Vendi
 1979 - Radha Enna Pennkutti
 1979 - Pathivrutha
 1979 - Vadaka Veedu
 1979 - Iniyathra
 1979 - Pathinalam Ravu As Moidu
 1978 - Ashwathmma
 1978 - Bhrashtu
 1978 - Sathrathil Oru Rathri
 1978 - Manoradham
 1978 - Thanal
 1978 - Randilonnu As Rajan
 1978 - Uthrada Rathri
 1978 - Ekakini
 1977 - Niraparayum Nilavilakkum
 1977 - Choondakkari
 1976 - Yudhabhoomi
 1976 - Chottanikkara Amma
 1975 - Velicham Akale
 1975 - Boy Friend
 1975 - Niramala
 1975 - Ullasayathra
 1975 - Thomasleeha
 1974 - Udayam Kizhakku Thanne
 1973 - Nirmalyam
 1973 - Duvidha

References

External links
 
 Ravi Menon at MSI

Male actors in Malayalam cinema
Male actors from Palakkad
Indian male film actors
1950 births
2007 deaths
Deaths from cancer in India
Film and Television Institute of India alumni
21st-century Indian male actors
20th-century Indian male actors